The Michigan–Michigan State basketball rivalry is a college basketball rivalry between Michigan Wolverines men's basketball and Michigan State Spartans men's basketball that is part of the larger intrastate rivalry between the University of Michigan and Michigan State University that exists across a broad spectrum of endeavors including their general athletic programs: Michigan Wolverines and Michigan State Spartans. On the field, the athletic rivalry includes the Paul Bunyan Trophy and the Michigan–Michigan State ice hockey rivalry, but extends to almost all sports and many other forms of achievement. Both teams are members of the Big Ten Conference.

The rivalry has been evidenced both on the court and off the court. Among the off the court elements of the rivalry, recruiting of basketball talent has resulted in battles, the most notable of which turned into the University of Michigan basketball scandal, the investigation of which began when both schools sought the services of Mateen Cleaves. Michigan leads the all-time series; however, Michigan State leads the series since joining the Big Ten in 1950.

Series history

Michigan currently leads the series, which began on January 9, 1909. However, Michigan State currently leads the series since joining the Big Ten in 1950.  As a result of the Big Ten moving to 11 teams with the addition of Penn State, teams were not guaranteed two games against each other. Accordingly, the schools chose to play one game that did not count as a conference game in 1997. When the Big Ten went to a 20-game conference schedule in 2018–19, the conference announced that the teams would always play each other twice in each season.

A 1996 rollover accident during Michigan's recruitment of Mateen Cleaves led to a long investigation surrounding the University of Michigan basketball scandal. Cleaves eventually matriculated at Michigan State.

Despite the intense rivalry for basketball recruits and resources and the intensity of the rivalry in other sports, the rivalry had not been intense (as measured by rankings) on the basketball court until the 2010s when the teams met 7 times in a row as ranked opponents.

On February 12, 2013, for the first time in the series' 170-game history, dating back to 1909, the teams met while both were ranked in the Top 10. The Spartans (20–4, 9–2 Big Ten) were ranked No. 8 in both the AP Top 25 Poll and USA Today Coaches Poll, while the Wolverines (21–3, 8–3 Big Ten) came in ranked No. 4 in the AP poll and No. 5 in the coaches poll. Michigan State won the game at the Breslin Center, 75–52. The following month, both teams were once again ranked in the Top 10, this time Michigan was on the winning end of a game played at the Crisler Center, by a score of 58–57.

Indiana Mr. Basketball for 2012, Gary Harris, and 2013 Indiana Mr. Basketball Zak Irvin were teammates at Hamilton Southeastern High School, but Irvin signed with Michigan after Harris had joined Michigan State. The two were best friends from third grade through high school and even wagered on the January 17, 2012 game in high school after the two had committed to different basketball programs, with Harris having to wear Maize and Blue for a day as a result.

At the time of the first 2013–14 Big Ten season matchup of the teams, Sporting News Bill Bender felt the rivalry was the best in the Big Ten largely due to the teams' excellence in the prior three seasons. With Michigan State riding an 11-game winning streak, including seven in conference, and Michigan riding an eight-game winning streak, including six in conference, the January 25 game marked the first time in Big Ten history that two teams have met when both teams were 6–0 or better in conference play. (#21/#25T) Michigan defeated the (#3/#3) Spartans 80–75. It was the first time Michigan ever defeated three consecutive AP Poll top ten opponents and marked the first time since the 1986–87 Iowa Hawkeyes that any team has won three consecutive games against top 10 opponents. It also gave the team consecutive road wins against top five opponents after a 36-game losing streak against them. Michigan's 7–0 Big Ten start was their best since the 1976–77 team won its first eight games.

Both teams advanced to the championship game of the 2014 Big Ten Conference tournament, marking the first time they have faced each other in any postseason tournament, and the first time they played three games against each other in one season. Michigan State won by a score of 69–55 securing the conference's automatic bid to the NCAA tournament. For the first rivalry contest of the 2014–15 Big Ten season, Michigan alum Nik Stauskas and Michigan State alum Draymond Green, the 2014 and 2012 Big Ten Conference Men's Basketball Players of the Year, respectively, had a highly publicized Twitter war of words and bet on the game.

On February 12, 2013, freshman Mitch McGary made his first career start in an NCAA game for the Wolverines against the Spartans, which featured  Adreian Payne in the starting lineup. After Payne (15th) and McGary (21st) were both selected in the first round of the 2014 NBA Draft, McGary made his first NBA start on March 13, 2015 for the 2014–15 Oklahoma City Thunder, with Payne in the starting lineup for the 2014–15 Minnesota Timberwolves as the opposing power forward.

The incoming class for the 2017–18 Big Ten  season included high school teammates Jordan Poole and Jaren Jackson Jr. who joined Michigan and Michigan State respectively after teaming up to win the 2017 Dicks National High School Championship.

The 2018 Mr. Basketball of Michigan finalist lineup was composed entirely of Big Ten conference recruits, including two players for Michigan and two for Michigan State. Michigan State's Foster Loyer (3,691 points) won, while Michigan's Brandon Johns (2,792) and David DeJulius (2,542) finished second and third, respectively. Marcus Bingham, an MSU recruit, was the fourth player set to attend one of the rivals.

In 2019, MSU defeated the Wolverines three times, going a perfect 3–0. The second game between the two teams marked the final regular season game and decided who would share the conference championship with Purdue. Michigan State prevailed over Michigan to sweep the regular season series. In the final meeting between the team, this time in the Big Ten tournament championship, Michigan State defeated Michigan for the third time on the season. In each of the schools three meetings in 2019, each school was ranked in the top 10 of the AP Poll.

Another element of the rivalry is that Michigan (1964, 1992*, 1993* and 2018) and Michigan State (1999 and 2001) are the only two schools to have had both their hockey team and basketball team qualify for the final four of the NCAA Men's Ice Hockey Championship and NCAA Division I men's basketball tournament in the same season.

Accomplishments by the two rivals
The following summarizes the accomplishments of the two programs.

Due to violations from the University of Michigan basketball scandal, Michigan was forced to vacate 113 victories, including seven against Michigan State, as well as four NCAA Tournament appearances, two Final Four appearances, one NIT Championship and one Big Ten tournament title. See Wikipedia:WikiProject College football/Vacated victories for further details for how vacated games are recorded.
Through July 29, 2020

Game results

Games with both teams ranked
(Rankings are from AP Poll)

Game Results

References 

College basketball rivalries in the United States
Big Ten Conference rivalries
Michigan Wolverines men's basketball
Michigan State Spartans men's basketball
1909 establishments in Michigan